2009–10 Országos Bajnokság I (men's water polo) (known as the Vodafone férfi OB I osztályú Országos Bajnokság for sponsorship reasons) was the 104th water polo championship in Hungary.

First stage 

Pld - Played; W - Won; L - Lost; G+ - Points for; G- - Points against; Diff - Difference; P - Points.

Championship Playoff

European competition Playoff 

Pld - Played; W - Won; L - Lost; G+ - Points for; G- - Points against; Diff - Difference; P - Points; BP - Bonus Points.

Relegation Playoff 

Pld - Played; W - Won; L - Lost; G+ - Points for; G- - Points against; Diff - Difference; P - Points; Bp - Bonus Points.

Final standing

Sources 
Magyar sportévkönyv 2011

Seasons in Hungarian water polo competitions
Hungary
2009 in water polo
2009 in Hungarian sport
2010 in water polo
2010 in Hungarian sport